The Children of the Vault are a group of fictional superhuman beings appearing in American comic books published by Marvel Comics. First created by Mike Carey and Chris Bachalo, the Children of the Vault debuted in X-Men (vol. 2) #188 (September 2006). They are primarily antagonists of the X-Men.

The Children of the Vault were raised in the closed vault aboard a cargo ship, where temporal acceleration technology was used to evolve individuals into super-powered beings. Due to genetic drift, they are a separate species from both baseline humans and mutants. Their goal is to exterminate both humans and mutants in order to take over the Earth.

Fictional team biography

Supernovas
The Children of the Vault first appear In the X-Men arc "Supernovas," as super-powered beings who aim to exterminate both mutants and baseline humans, in order to claim Earth for themselves. While pursuing Sabretooth, two of the Children, Sangre and Serafina, use a "singularity generator" to destroy a town in Nogales, Mexico, framing the X-Men for the disaster. Two others, Aguja and Fuego ambush Sabretooth, who escapes and seeks help from the X-Men. All four Children of the Vault next kill all of the members of the S.H.I.E.L.D. facility where Northstar has been held captive and take him, and later Aurora, in order to kill Sabretooth. Serafina doctors mages of the X-Men into the security footage, further discrediting the team. They also enhance the powers of the twins, Aurora and Northstar, so that they now produce a powerful heat blast when touching.

After sending an enhanced Northstar and Aurora to kill Sabretooth and the X-Men, Serafina watches from a distance with another one of the Children, Perro. The surprise attack is initially successful, causing the apparent death of Iceman and severe injuries to many of the X-Men. Luckily, Aurora is defeated thanks to Mystique's manipulation and Iceman's surprise (though incomplete) reformation, and Northstar is defeated by the combined efforts of Rogue and Cable.

Following the fight, Sabretooth informs Cable that their enemies are known as "The Children of the Vault." They are neither humans nor mutants, but a new species, evolutionarily distinct from either branch, created by a scientist and then cycled through normal evolutionary processes over the course of 6,000 years inside a time-accelerated cargo ship off the coast of Peru. Their cargo ship, the Conquistador, was designed to stay sealed until the planet was empty for the Children to take over. However, the energy discharge from the Decimation caused their vault to open early. Sabretooth also reveals that he was hired by one of the scientists to kill everyone involved in their creation. 

Meanwhile, Serafina uses her cloaking abilities to infiltrate the mansion directly. She is invisible to telepaths, and Wolverine is only mildly aware that something is amiss. She easily makes her way to the injured Lady Mastermind in the infirmary, and hijacks her abilities in order to trap Cannonball in an illusion. Wolverine manages to free Cannonball; however, Serafina subdues both mutants. 

Serafina then rejoins her team, en route to New York. Rogue and her team, now including Lady Mastermind, Sabretooth, and Omega Sentinel, track and board the Children's ship. However, in the ensuing fight, the X-Men are overwhelmed, with Iceman essentially vaporized by Fuego, as the Conquistador hovers over the Xavier Institute, ready to destroy all the mutants within.

The X-Men fight back, though, destroying the weapons that would have destroyed the school, and killing several of the Children of the Vault, including Sangre, Aguja, and Fuego.  With his last breath, Sangre tries to crash the Conquistador into the school, but it is stopped at the last minute by Cannonball and the ONE Sentinels.  Many of the Children of the Vault (including Perro) manage to escape the battle alive, leaving behind animal carcasses altered to resemble them. The survivors, led by the mysterious Cadena, are revealed to have escaped to Ecuador, to the abandoned Sentinel facility once used by Cassandra Nova.

The X-Men continue to use the captured Conquistador as a flying base of operations for some time.

Collision
The X-Men next encounter the Children of the Vault in Mumbai. A rebellious young member of the Children, Luz, escapes from the group's new headquarters, the futuristic city "The Corridor" (also known as Quitado), and lands in Mumbai during what appears to be a magnetic storm. She immediately encounters the X-Men Rogue, Magneto, Loa, and Anole, who along with their teammate Indra, are visiting Indra's family nearby. Luz claims to be a local girl named Luisa. When "Luisa" demonstrates her ability to paint colors in the air via light manipulation, Rogue, suspecting her to be a mutant, offers her hospitality at Indra's family's home. The remaining Children, led by a woman named Corregidora, pursue Luz, whom they believe to be critical to something called "Angelfire." Eventually, a team of Children, including Serafina, Cadena, and Perro, attack Indra's family home. The Children defeat the X-Men easily, and only spare their lives when Luz offers to return with them. The Children take Luz, Rogue, and Magneto with them back to the Corridor, located, according to Cadena "in the void between dimensions." There, Magneto learns that the magnetic storms menacing Mumbai are a waste byproduct of the Corridor's power grid. Angelfire, Cadena explains, is a new, cleaner engine, to be powered by "the 30," a group of Children including Luz -- and the captured Magneto. Cadena and her team prepare to initiate Angelfire. Meanwhile, Corregidora and Perro officiate over Rogue's public execution in the "Sensorium," a psychic link among all the Children. Angelfire fails spectacularly because Luz has traded places with Indra's human fiancee, Vaipala. The Corridor crashes into Mumbai. Rogue and Magneto escape from Quitado, with help from Luz, Anole, Indra, and Loa, and send Quitado back into the void between dimensions. Magneto predicts that the Children will be unable to find their way back to Earth.

Dawn of X
The Children of the Vault reappear during the Dawn of X era of X-Men comics. Serafina is rescued from captivity by the X-Men, during a raid on a base of the X-Men's enemy Orchis. Later, Darwin, Synch, and X-23 are tasked with infiltrating the Children's base of operations in Ecuador. The Children of the Vault are also revealed to be the earliest members of the Post-Humans, better known as Homo novissima, a race destined to depose both Homo sapiens and Homo superior as the dominant species on Earth. 

Once inside the Vault, the trio battle against the Children of the Vault with X-23 seemingly killing Serafina and Fuego and Synch killing Sangre and Perro by using Fuego's powers. In retaliation, Aguja unleashes a massive force field in an attempt to kill her foes, killing herself in the process. The trio survive the attack and gather intelligence for the next 100 years. They learn that at the heart of the Vault lies the City, a supercomputer that has become self-aware and eventually has expressed a desire to expand beyond the Vault, therefore creating in the process the Children of the Vault. After Serafina's capture and escape from Orchis and the rise of the nation of Krakoa, the City has created the third generation of the Children so they can eventually take over Earth. Darwin, X-23, and Synch also learn that any Children who have died are resurrected by the City through cloning to further the evolution process. The City soon becomes interested in Darwin's adaptation power. The Children capture Darwin in order to learn more about his power. Consequently, the City is able to create a fourth generation of Children. The Children chase and are able to prevent Wolverine and Synch from escaping the Vault. Before dying, however, Synch manages to make a telepathic contact with Professor Xavier and ensure everything he's learned about the Children of the Vault is passed onto his resurrected form.

Project Blackbox
Later Forge and Cyclops travel to Ecuador where the home of the posthuman Children of the Vault is located. Once they reached the giant ruined Sentinel that contains the Vault, its revealed that Forge had built a weapon pointing into the entrance of the Vault that if the door opens will fire a little black hole that will collapse and take the Vault and the entire population inside into the unknown. However just as Cyclops and Forge are debating the ethics of what will happens, the door of the Vault opened, and the Children emerged from it. Forge uses his secret weapon Project Blackbox to subdue them but because the Children of the Vault had become greatly evolved and extremely powerful, they quickly overwhelm the two mutants, with Forge losing a hand and Cyclops being killed by Fuego's flames after he absorbed and redirected Cyclops' optic blast. The Children of the Vault then travel to Krakoa which falls less than a day after the Vault opened. New York City is the next to fall, burned to the ground as the Avengers went down swinging with Ghost Rider killed by Fuego.
The Children then kills the Fantastic Four. Sangre drowns Thing, Fuego kills Johnny, Reed is dead on the ground and Serafina snaps Sue's neck.
Earth's mystics lasted the longest and Latveria was the last stand of mankind. Clea and Doom are eventually killed nevertheless.
Insatiable, the Children of the Vault journeyed to Asgard, where they killed everyone and eat a feast on top of Thor's dead body. However, it was soon revealed that all this was actually a simulated reality that contained not only the Children of the Vault but the entire Vault itself inside of a bio-dome. Forge then entered inside of the bio-dome in order to rescue Darwin from the Vault.

Members

The Children of the Vault members are:

Sangre (Blood): The de facto team leader, he has grey skin that is apparently made of liquid and, thanks to his advanced water manipulation abilities, can produce bubbles used to suffocate his victims, among other things. He has an aquatic body which is not easily harmed. During the fight at the Xavier Institute, Mystique shot Sangre with thermite bullets, which evaporated the water in his body when they exploded, killing him.

Perro (Dog): He possesses superhuman strength, durability and control over gravity. A massive, battle-hungry man, Perro is the muscle of the Children of the Vault and is always searching for a fight. Despite being the typical "brick" of the team, Perro is quite intelligent and expresses himself very well.

Serafina (Seraph): A technopath, she is able to mechanically interface with machinery and other people. With her powers, she can enhance and control their powers. Her human senses are masterfully enhanced as well. She can differentiate between psionic illusions and reality on sight. Serafina is also able to detect genetic and bio-chemical data down to the molecular level. This makes her an extraordinary tracker, capable not only of tracing a target's path but also identifying any person or object they might have touched and recognizing subtle shifts in their body chemistry or metabolism, such as changes in adrenaline levels or pulse rate. She can also manipulate bio-molecular ingredients to some degree.

Aguja (Needle): She possesses powers that include the projection of energy blasts and force fields. During the battle against the X-Men, Lady Mastermind projected an illusion to make Aguja look like her, causing Fuego to mistakenly kill Aguja.

Fuego (Fire): Has the appearance of a flaming skeleton. He possesses magma powers that are fueled by the energy he gets from his surroundings. He has been killed by Iceman.

Cadena (Chain): The new leader of the Children after Sangre's apparent demise, she has a globe of electricity surrounding her head that she can manipulate into electrical chains.

Luz (Light): She has the ability to bend and manipulate light, "painting" or shaping it into anything she wishes. Can manipulate light and project holograms of current events happening elsewhere.

Corregidora (Mayor): Can implant suggestions into the minds of others with verbal spells. She operates the House of Corrections. Her weapon is a knife. She apparently holds a grudge against the X-Men from their last encounter.

Martillo (Hammer): Superhuman strength and resistance; uses a large hammer in battle.

Olvido (Oblivion): Able to take anything directed at him into what he calls "the void" and direct it back at his opponents in his own form of energy.

Rana (Frog): She can physically merge with an opponent's body to either possess them or attack them from the inside.

Piedra Dura (Hard Stone): Solid stone form, possessing no blood and enhanced mass and durability.

Approximately 3,000 members as evidenced in X-Men (vol. 2) #193.

References

External links
 

Marvel Comics supervillain teams
X-Men supporting characters
Characters created by Mike Carey
Characters created by Chris Bachalo